Christian Metz (1794–1867) was born in Germany and immigrated to the United States on October 26, 1842.  Once in the U.S., he helped to create a colony for the Community of True Inspiration, a pietist sect. The first was named Ebenezer near what is now Buffalo, New York. In 1855, he relocated to Iowa along with the 1,200-strong congregation and assisted in the founding of the Amana Colonies.

See also
Amana Colonies
Inspirationalists

References

Further reading
F. Alan DuVal. Christian Metz: German-American Religious Leader & Pioneer. Ed. Peter Hoehnle. Penfield Books, 2005. 

1794 births
1867 deaths
Amana Colonies
German emigrants to the United States
Founders of utopian communities